The ruddy woodcreeper (Dendrocincla homochroa) is a passerine bird which breeds in the tropical New World from southern Mexico to northern Colombia and extreme northern Venezuela.

It is almost entirely rufous, with a paler throat and grey line from the bill to the eye. The bill is longish and straight.

The call is a squeaky quink or loud deeah.

Ruddy woodcreepers feed on spiders and insects. They will follow columns of army ants, sometimes in groups of up to three birds, dropping from saplings to catch prey fleeing the ants.

It builds a leaf-lined nest  up in a hollow palm tree stump, and lays 2–3 white eggs. Adult birds also sleep alone in tree crevices.

Like other woodland birds, this species has been adversely affected by deforestation. For example, in Colombia it is apparently common in the northwestern Sierra Nevada de Santa Marta, though otherwise a rather rare bird. This species apparently avoids human-altered habitat and secondary forest whenever possible. It is thus useful as a bioindicator.

Nonetheless, it occupies a large range and wherever sufficient habitat remains, it is often not particularly uncommon. The IUCN considers it a Species of Least Concern.

References

External links

 
 
 
 

ruddy woodcreeper
Birds of Central America
Birds of Colombia
Birds of Venezuela
ruddy woodcreeper
ruddy woodcreeper